Silentium is a 2004 Austrian film based on a novel by Wolf Haas.

Cast 
Josef Hader - Simon Brenner
Simon Schwarz - Berti
Joachim Król - Sportpräfekt Fitz
Maria Köstlinger - Konstanze Dornhelm
Udo Samel - Festspielpräsident
Tini Kainrath - Opernsängerin
Jürgen Tarrach - Opernsänger

References

External links
 

2000s crime films
Austrian crime drama films
Films based on Austrian novels
Films based on crime novels